Matheus Henrique de Souza (born 19 December 1997) is a Brazilian professional footballer who plays as a midfielder for Serie A club Sassuolo. He also represents the Brazil national team.

Club career
On 11 August 2021, Matheus Henrique joined Italian Serie A club Sassuolo on a season-long loan from Grêmio, with an obligation to buy.

International career
Matheus Henrique made his senior debut for Brazil in a October 2019 friendly against Senegal. Previously, he was part of the Brazil under-23 team that won the 2019 Toulon Tournament, beating Japan on penalties in the final. Courtesy of his Grêmio performances, he became a mainstay of the under-23 team preparing to compete at the Tokyo Olympics. He participated in the International Tenerife Tournament in 2019 and the CONMEBOL Pre-Olympic Tournament in 2020 with the under-23 team, finishing runner-up in both competitions and securing a place at the Olympics with their performance in the latter.

On 17 June 2021, Matheus Henrique was named in the Brazil squad for the 2020 Summer Olympics.

Career statistics

Club

International

Honours
Grêmio
Campeonato Gaúcho: 2018, 2019, 2020, 2021

Brazil U23
Summer Olympics: 2020
Toulon Tournament: 2019

References

External links

1997 births
Living people
Brazilian footballers
Footballers from São Paulo
Association football midfielders
Associação Desportiva São Caetano players
Grêmio Foot-Ball Porto Alegrense players
U.S. Sassuolo Calcio players
Campeonato Brasileiro Série A players
Serie A players
Brazil youth international footballers
Brazil international footballers
Olympic footballers of Brazil
Footballers at the 2020 Summer Olympics
Olympic medalists in football
Olympic gold medalists for Brazil
Medalists at the 2020 Summer Olympics
Brazilian expatriate footballers
Brazilian expatriate sportspeople in Italy
Expatriate footballers in Italy